Phosphine (IUPAC name: phosphane) is a colorless, flammable, highly toxic compound with the chemical formula , classed as a pnictogen hydride. Pure phosphine is odorless, but technical grade samples have a highly unpleasant odor like rotting fish, due to the presence of substituted phosphine and diphosphane. With traces of  present,  is spontaneously flammable in air (pyrophoric), burning with a luminous flame. Phosphine is a highly toxic respiratory poison, and is immediately dangerous to life or health at 50 ppm. Phosphine has a trigonal pyramidal structure.

They have the general formula . Phosphanes are saturated phosphorus hydrides of the form , such as triphosphane. Phosphine, PH3, is the smallest of the phosphines and the smallest of the phosphanes.

History
Philippe Gengembre (1764–1838), a student of Lavoisier, first obtained phosphine in 1783 by heating white phosphorus in an aqueous solution of potash (potassium carbonate).

Perhaps because of its strong association with elemental phosphorus, phosphine was once regarded as a gaseous form of the element, but Lavoisier (1789) recognised it as a combination of phosphorus with hydrogen and described it as phosphure d'hydrogène (phosphide of hydrogen).

He considered diphosphine's formula to be , and thus an intermediate between elemental phosphorus, the higher polymers, and phosphine. Calcium phosphide (nominally ) produces more  than other phosphides because of the preponderance of P-P bonds in the starting material.

The name "phosphine" was first used for organophosphorus compounds in 1857, being analogous to organic amines.  The gas  was named "phosphine" by 1865 (or earlier).

Structure and properties
 is a trigonal pyramidal molecule with C3v molecular symmetry. The length of the P−H bond is 1.42 Å, the H−P−H bond angles are 93.5°. For this reason, the lone pair on phosphorus may be regarded as predominantly formed by the 3s orbital of phosphorus. The upfield chemical shift of the phosphorus atom in the 31P NMR spectrum accords with the conclusion that the lone pair electrons occupy the 3s orbital (Fluck, 1973). This electronic structure leads to a lack of nucleophilicity in general and lack of basicity in particular (pKaH = –14), as well as an ability to form only weak hydrogen bonds.

Phosphine dissolves more readily in non-polar solvents than in water because of the non-polar P−H bonds. It is technically amphoteric in water, but acid and base activity is poor. Proton exchange proceeds via a phosphonium ion in acidic solutions and via phosphanide at high pH, with equilibrium constants Kb =  and Ka = .

Water 
Phosphine upon contact with water at high pressure and temperature produces phosphoric acid and hydrogen:

Burning 
Burning phosphine in the air produced phosphorus pentoxide (P2O5) (which reacts with water to produce phosphoric acid):

Preparation and occurrence
Phosphine may be prepared in a variety of ways. Industrially it can be made by the reaction of white phosphorus with sodium or potassium hydroxide, producing potassium or sodium hypophosphite as a by-product. 

Alternatively, the acid-catalyzed disproportionation of white phosphorus yields phosphoric acid and phosphine. Both routes have industrial significance; the acid route is the preferred method if further reaction of the phosphine to substituted phosphines is needed. The acid route requires purification and pressurizing.

Laboratory routes
It is prepared in the laboratory by disproportionation of phosphorous acid:

Phosphine evolution occurs at around 200 °C.  

Alternative methods are the hydrolysis of tris(trimethylsilyl)phosphine, or of metal phosphides such as aluminium phosphide, or calcium phosphide:

Occurrence
Phosphine is a worldwide constituent of the Earth's atmosphere at very low and highly variable concentrations. It may contribute significantly to the global phosphorus biochemical cycle.  The most likely source is reduction of phosphate in decaying organic matter, possibly via partial reductions and disproportionations, since environmental systems do not have known reducing agents of sufficient strength to directly convert phosphate to phosphine.

It is also found in Jupiter's atmosphere.

Possible extraterrestrial biosignature

In 2020 a spectroscopic analysis was reported to show signs of phosphine in the atmosphere of Venus in quantities that could not be explained by known abiotic processes. Later re-analysis of this work showed interpolation errors had been made, re-analysis of data with the fixed algorithm either do not result in the detection of phosphine. The authors of the original study then claimed to detect it with a much lower concentration of 1 ppb.

Applications

Organophosphorus chemistry
Phosphine is a precursor to many organophosphorus compounds. It reacts with formaldehyde in the presence of hydrogen chloride to give tetrakis(hydroxymethyl)phosphonium chloride, which is used in textiles.  The hydrophosphination of alkenes is versatile route to a variety of phosphines. For example, in the presence of basic catalysts  adds of Michael acceptors.  Thus with acrylonitrile, it reacts to give tris(cyanoethyl)phosphine:

Acid catalysis is applicable to hydrophosphination with isobutylene and related analogues:

Microelectronics
Phosphine is used as a dopant in the semiconductor industry, and a precursor for the deposition of compound semiconductors.  Commercially significant products include gallium phosphide and indium phosphide.

Fumigant
For farm use, pellets of aluminium phosphide (AlP), calcium phosphide (Ca3P2), or zinc phosphide (Zn3P2) release phosphine upon contact with atmospheric water or rodents' stomach acid. These pellets also contain agents to reduce the potential for ignition or explosion of the released phosphine. Use of the gas avoids the issues related with the solid residues left by metal phosphide and results in faster, more efficient control of the target pests.

Because the previously popular fumigant methyl bromide has been phased out in some countries under the Montreal Protocol, phosphine is the only widely used, cost-effective, rapidly acting fumigant that does not leave residues on the stored product. Pests with high levels of resistance toward phosphine have become common in Asia, Australia and Brazil. High level resistance is also likely to occur in other regions, but has not been as closely monitored. Genetic variants that contribute to high level resistance to phosphine have been identified in the dihydrolipoamide dehydrogenase gene. Identification of this gene now allows rapid molecular identification of resistant insects.

Toxicity and safety

Deaths have resulted from accidental exposure to fumigation materials containing aluminium phosphide or phosphine. It can be absorbed either by inhalation or transdermally.  As a respiratory poison, it affects the transport of oxygen or interferes with the utilization of oxygen by various cells in the body. Exposure results in pulmonary edema (the lungs fill with fluid). Phosphine gas is heavier than air so it stays near the floor.

Phosphine appears to be mainly a redox toxin, causing cell damage by inducing oxidative stress and mitochondrial dysfunction. Resistance in insects is caused by a mutation in a mitochondrial metabolic gene.

Phosphine can be absorbed into the body by inhalation. Direct contact with phosphine liquid – although unlikely to occur – may cause frostbite, like other cryogenic liquids. The main target organ of phosphine gas is the respiratory tract. According to the 2009 U.S. National Institute for Occupational Safety and Health (NIOSH) pocket guide, and U.S. Occupational Safety and Health Administration (OSHA) regulation, the 8 hour average respiratory exposure should not exceed 0.3 ppm. NIOSH recommends that the short term respiratory exposure to phosphine gas should not exceed 1 ppm. The Immediately Dangerous to Life or Health level is 50 ppm. Overexposure to phosphine gas causes nausea, vomiting, abdominal pain, diarrhea, thirst, chest tightness, dyspnea (breathing difficulty), muscle pain, chills, stupor or syncope, and pulmonary edema. Phosphine has been reported to have the odor of decaying fish or garlic at concentrations below 0.3 ppm. The smell is normally restricted to laboratory areas or phosphine processing since the smell comes from the way the phosphine is extracted from the environment. However, it may occur elsewhere, such as in industrial waste landfills. Exposure to higher concentrations may cause olfactory fatigue.

Explosiveness 
Phosphine gas is denser than air and hence may collect in low-lying areas. It can form explosive mixtures with air, and may also self-ignite.

See also
Diphosphane, simplified to 
Diphosphene, HP=PH

Notes

References

Further reading

External links

 International Chemical Safety Card 0694
 CDC – Phosphine – NIOSH Workplace Safety and Health Topic

Fumigants
Functional groups
Industrial gases

Phosphorus hydrides
Phosphorus(−III) compounds
Blood agents